Mahogany Rush IV is the fourth studio album by Canadian Rock music band Mahogany Rush, led by Frank Marino. It was released in 1976 on Columbia Records.

Covers of 3 of the songs on Mahogany Rush IV, "The Answer" (Randy Hansen), "It's Begun to Rain" (Audley Freed), and "Dragonfly" (Karl Cochran), appear on the 2005 Secondhand Smoke - A Tribute to Frank Marino album.

Track listing 
All songs by Frank Marino.

 "I'm Going Away" - 4:06
 "Man at the Back Door" - 3:42
 "The Answer" - 4:33
 "Jive Baby" - 3:24
 "It's Begun to Rain" - 6:25
 "Dragonfly" - 5:07
 "Little Sexy Annie" - 3:23
 "Moonwalk" - 5:47
 "IV... (The Emperor)” - 7:17

Personnel 
 Frank Marino -  Acoustic and Electric Guitars, Synth Bass on "I'm Going Away", Mellotron on "I'm Going Away", "It's Begun to Rain" and "IV... (The Emperor)", all vocals
 Paul Harwood - Acoustic & Electric Bass
 Jimmy Ayoub - Drums, Percussion

Charts

References 

1976 albums
Mahogany Rush albums
Columbia Records albums